Hasan Ahmad Rashid (: also spelled Hassan Rasheed; July 10, 1896 – May 25, 1969) was an Egyptian composer and operatic baritone. He was part of Egypt's first generation of classical composers.

Biography
As a youth, Rashid studied violin and singing in Cairo. He went to England in 1914 to pursue studies in agriculture at Durham University. While there, he continued his studies in violin, composition, and singing, occasionally performing in University concerts as a violinist and a baritone. He returned to Cairo in 1918 where he began to compose vocal music to Arabic texts. He was part of that nation's first generation of composers to produce classical music. Rashid's work culminated
in his sole opera Masra' Antonio (Antony's Death), which has an Arabic text, based on the first part of Ahmed Shawqi's play Cleopatra's Death. The work was influenced by Italian opera, yet Rashid's melodic invention is not without originality. It is the first opera to be composed by an Egyptian. Parts of the work were produced in 1942, but a full staging was not mounted until 1973 by the Egyptian Opera Troupe at the Cairo Opera House. However, the Egyptian public found it difficult to accept the conventions of Western operatic style, particularly when associated with familiar poetry in Arabic, and Rasheed’s opera had few immediate successors. The opera's overture and the aria Isis, O fount of tenderness are often performed separately.

Rashid was married to the pianist and composer of children's songs Baheega Sidky Rasheed (1899-1987), who is best known for her 1958 collection entitled Egyptian Folk Songs (republished in the United States as Egyptian Folk Songs in Arabic and English. Together, they founded the Egyptian Amateur Music Association in 1942. He died in Cairo, aged 72.

See also
List of Egyptian composers

References

 Samha El-Kholy: "Hasan Rashid", Grove Music Online ed. L. Macy (Accessed September 20, 2008), (subscription access)

External links
Hasan Rashid page

Egyptian composers
Egyptian opera composers
20th-century classical composers
1896 births
1969 deaths
Musicians from Cairo
Egyptian violinists
Alumni of Durham University
Male classical composers
20th-century classical violinists
20th-century male musicians
Male classical violinists
Egyptian expatriates in the United Kingdom